Kamuthakudi is a village in Paramakudi taluk, Ramanathapuram district, Tamil Nadu in southern India belonging to Paramakudi Taluk. Kamuthakudi also belongs to Paramakudi Assembly constituency which is a part of Ramanathapuram (Lok Sabha constituency).

References

External links 
 Wikimapia

Cities and towns in Ramanathapuram district